Agninakshathram is a 1977 Indian Malayalam film,  directed by A. Vincent and produced by M. O. Joseph. The film stars Lakshmi, Mohan Sharma, Adoor Bhasi and Kottayam Santha in the lead roles. The film has musical score by G. Devarajan.

Cast

Lakshmi
Mohan Sharma
Adoor Bhasi
Kottayam Santha
Sam
Sankaradi
James
Baby Madhavi
Bahadoor
Bindulatha
George Thachil
Janardanan
KPAC Sunny
M. G. Soman
Mallika Sukumaran
Master Thankappan
N. Govindankutty
Nanditha Bose
Oduvil Unnikrishnan
P. K. Abraham
Paravoor Bharathan
Paul Manjila

Soundtrack
The music was composed by G. Devarajan and the lyrics were written by Sasikala Menon.

References

External links
 

1977 films
1970s Malayalam-language films